Harry William Helmer (November 26, 1884 – April 11, 1971) was an American football player and coach of football, basketball, and baseball coach.  He served as the head football coach at Central Michigan Normal School, now Central Michigan University, from 1909 to 1912 and at Alma College in 1916 and 1917, compiling a career college football record of 20–10–2.  Helmer was also the head basketball coach at Central Michigan from 1910 to 1916 and at Alma from 1916 to 1918, amassing a career college basketball mark of 50–40.  In addition, he was the head baseball coach at Central Michigan from 1910 to 1916, tallying a mark of 33–26–2.

Helmer was an alumnus of Alma College who also studied at Columbia University. He later served for many years as the superintendent of schools in Alma, Michigan. We was also served 18 years as a supervisor of Parma Township and was the director of the welfare department in Jackson County, Michigan, from 1944 to 1954.

Helmer was married to Hazel Potter. They had a son, Hal, and a daughter, Wilhelmina. He died in a hospital in Jackson, Michigan, in 1971.

Head coaching record

Football

References

External links
 

1884 births
1971 deaths
Alma Scots baseball players
Alma Scots football coaches
Alma Scots football players
Alma Scots men's basketball coaches
Basketball coaches from Michigan
Central Michigan Chippewas baseball coaches
Central Michigan Chippewas football coaches
Central Michigan Chippewas men's basketball coaches
College men's track and field athletes in the United States
People from Jackson County, Michigan